Arthur Alfred Sales (4 March 1900–1977) was an English footballer who played in the Football League for Chelsea and Queens Park Rangers.

References

1900 births
1977 deaths
English footballers
Association football midfielders
English Football League players
Redhill F.C. players
Chelsea F.C. players
Queens Park Rangers F.C. players
Olympique Alès players
AFC Bournemouth players